A Hint of You is a 2013 Taiwanese romantic television series with a food theme television series produced by Sanlih E-Television, starring , Nana Lee, Danson Tang, Jay Shih,  and Hans Zhang as the main cast. The Chinese title literally translates to "Taste of Missing You". Filming began on February 14, 2013 and completed on June 25, 2013, the drama was filmed as it aired. First original broadcast began on March 6, 2013 on SETTV airing on weekdays from 9:00-10:00 pm, final episode aired on June 28, 2013 with 68 episodes total. This is SETTV last drama to air during its weekday 9:00-10:00 pm timeslot before it was obsoleted to air variety programs instead.

Synopsis 
Xia Qing You works as a cook at her small family owned seafood restaurant that was started by her late father. She is unaware that the dishes she creates are subpar, until Fu Zai Yu dines at her restaurant one evening and harshly criticizes her cooking. Not taking his comments well, she, her family and regular patrons at the restaurant out number Zai Yu in his argument. One day a VIP customer who was a regular patron of her father reserves the entire restaurant and pays top dollars to taste a lobster dish he had eaten when her dad was running the restaurant. After tasting Qing You's dishes he is not happy and starts comparing her father's cooking to hers, he also tells her that her level of cooking will eventually put the restaurant out of business. After finding out that her father was once a chef at the high end Hana Japanese Restaurant, she decides to dine there to have a taste of their food. At Hana she runs into Zai Yu, who is the head chef at the restaurant. He cooks her his signature egg friend rice dish to show her how good food should taste like. Upon her first bite it brings her back to the taste of her father's fried rice dish. After many failed attempts at duplicating the taste of Zai Yu's dish, she begs and stalks Zai Yu to accept her as his student in order to learn how to make his fried rice dish.

Cast

Main 
 張勛傑 as Fu Zai Yu 傅在宇 - Male age 30
Nana Lee 李千娜 as Xia Qing You 夏青柚 - Female age 27
Danson Tang 唐禹哲 as Du Huai An 杜懷安 - Male age 26
 茵芙 as Xia Yi Huan 夏以歡 - Female age 25
Jay Shih as Sun Tian Hao 孫天皓 - Male age 27
 宋紀妍 as Song Yu Xin 宋玉欣 - Female age 26
Hans Zhang 張翰 as Lu Zhen Ya 陸振雅 - Male age 38

Supporting

Lung 100 restaurant/Xia family 
Akio Chen 陳慕義 as Xia De 夏德 - Male age 55
 柯淑勤 as Xia Lin Zhao Di 夏林招弟  - Female age 50
 as You Zhen Zhen 游真真 - Female age 22

Fu family 
Fu Lei 傅雷 as Fu Chang Nian 傅長年 - Male age 53
 黃采儀 as Zhou Jia Mei 周家梅 - Female age 51

Song family 
 王道 as Song Si Qi 宋斯祺 - Male age 54
 方文琳 as Zhang Wan Wan 張婉婉 / Ke Meng Rong 柯孟容 - Female age 49
 黃柏鈞 as Song Yu Zong 宋玉宗 - Male age 22

Hana Japanese restaurant staff 
 黃薇渟 as Wang Mei Xiang 王美香 - Female age 22
Kevin Zhou 周凱文 as Lian Wen Xiang 連文翔 - Male age 27
Vincent Qiu 邱俊儒 as Jin Zhong Gang 金仲剛 - Male age 30
Chen Jia Hao 陳嘉豪 as Guo Wei Cheng 郭偉成 - Male age 32
Josh Lu 陸侲曦 as Chen Kai Xi 陳凱曦 - Male age 20

Extended 
 as Driver 司機
 駱炫銘) as Dong Dong 東東
 地球 as Wang Zai 旺仔
Dou Fei 杜霏 as Boss Tsai 蔡老師
 趙舜 as Mr. Tu 涂先生
 沈昶宏 as young Zai Yu 小在宇
Vent Teng 鄧志鴻 as Guo Seng 高桑
 as General Manager 總經理
 林采欣 as Rebecca
 陳隨意 as Ah Siu Se 阿水師

Guest star 
Chris Wang 宥勝 as Zai Yu's friend
Summer Meng 孟耿如 as Zai Yu's friend
Alan Kuo 柯有倫 as Alan Zai Yu's friend
Jolie Cheng 程潔莉 as Zai Yu's friend
Ting Chiang 丁強 as Boss Lin 林老闆
 張兆志 as Host 主持人
 夏如芝 as Marko
Joelle Lu 陸明君 as Wang Fang Rui 王芳蕊
Gino 宇騰 as Mr. Michellin 米奇林先生
 田家達 as Fang Rui's ex-husband 芳蕊前夫

Soundtrack 

A Hint of You Original TV Soundtrack (OST) (美味的想念 電視原聲帶) was released on June 21, 2013 by various artists under Avex Taiwan Inc. record label. It contains 14 tracks total, in which 6 tracks are instrumental versions of the original songs. The opening theme is track 2 "A Hint of You 美味的想念 " by Danson Tang, while the closing theme is track 1 "Shouldn't Be Brave 不應該勇敢" by Soo Wincci.

Track listing

Broadcast

Episode ratings

Awards and nominations 
The 2013 Sanlih Drama Awards Ceremony were held on December 28, 2013 at Sanlih's headquarters and broadcasting studios at No. 159, Section 1, Jiuzong Rd, Neihu District Taipei City, Taiwan.

References

External links 

A Hint of YouTVB Website 

2013 Taiwanese television series debuts
2013 Taiwanese television series endings
Sanlih E-Television original programming
Taiwanese romance television series